Dorsey Road may refer to:

 Maryland Route 103
 Dorsey Road Warehouse, a U.S. National Security Agency facility located on Dorsey Road in Hanover, Maryland